Tiger was a weekly British comic magazine published from 1954 to 1985, originally by Amalgamated Press (AP) and later by IPC/Fleetway.

Launched as Tiger – The Sport and Adventure Picture Story Weekly, initially the publication predominantly featured sporting strips. Its most popular strip was Roy of the Rovers, a football-based strip recounting the life of Roy Race and the team he played for, Melchester Rovers. This strip proved so successful it was spun out of Tiger and into its own comic. In addition, sports stars such as Tony Greig, Geoff Boycott, Trevor Francis, Ian Botham, and Charlie Nicholas wrote columns for Tiger. Also many TV stars such as Morecambe and Wise appeared in Christmas issues, usually dressed up as Santa Claus.

Publication history 
Tiger debuted with the 11 September 1954 issue.

As was common with British comics during this period, Tiger absorbed a number of other comics magazines during its run; six in all. Following successive mergers with other AP publications in the 1950s, the comic was known as Tiger Incorporating the Champion (from 1955) and then (from 1959) Tiger and Comet.

Amalgamated Press was acquired by the Mirror Group in 1959, and renamed Fleetway Publications. Following successive mergers with other Fleetway publications in the 1960s, the comic was known as Tiger and Hurricane (from May 1965), then (from 1969) Tiger and Jag for many years. It was coupled with the football magazine Scorcher in 1974, resulting in Tiger and Scorcher appearing for more than six years. In 1980, there was a further, less successful, merger with another comic called Speed.

The end finally came on 30 March 1985, with Tiger merging into The Eagle from issue #159 of that comic, dated 6 April 1985, which was temporarily titled Eagle and Tiger (with some strips from Tiger coming to the merged publications).

In all, 1,573 issues were published, as well as a number of hardcover annuals.

Editorial team 
The comic was launched under the editorship of Derek Birnage, who remained at the helm from 1954 to 1963. The next editor was Barrie Tomlinson. Tomlinson became Group Editor in 1976, with Paul Gettens as editor.

Editorial assistants included Tony Peagam, Paul Gettens, and Terence Magee. Art editors included Mike Swanson and Trish Gordon-Pugh. Art Assistant:  Maurice Dolphin. Letterers: Stanley Richardson, Paul Bensberg, Peter Knight, John Aldrich.

List of strips

 Billy's Boots (writer Fred Baker, artist John Gilliat) – moved to Eagle, then Roy of the Rovers. A schoolboy believes his footballing success is down to a special pair of old boots.
 The Black Archer - adventure strip, featuring clumsy TV reporter Clem Macey's double-life as the titular costumed crimefighter.
 Death Wish (writer Barrie Tomlinson, artist Vanyo) – from Speed, moved to Eagle. A racing driver disfigured by an accident wears a leather mask and takes on increasingly dangerous stunts. This strip began just four years after a similar accident at the Nürburgring in which racing driver Niki Lauda suffered severe burns.
 The Destroyer from the Depths (Brian Lewis)
 Fairs Please!
 File of Fame (writer Terence Magee, artist Jim Bleach)
 Fisty Flynn
 Football Family Robinson (writers Fred Baker and later Tom Tully, artist Joe Colquhoun) about a lower division side called Thatchem United. All players had to be Robinson family members under the tutelage of Grandma Robinson. Team members included Crash Robinson (goalie), Alf Robinson, Fred Robinson, Grizzly Bear Robinson, Ron Robinson and Tich Robinson. Their biggest moment was when they got to Wembley and won the League Cup, in a manner similar to Swindon Town's 1969 victory over Arsenal in the same competition. The story resumed in Roy of the Rovers in the late 1970s.
 Golden Boy – moved to Eagle. Originally the story of an athletically gifted, but 'feral' boy, Jamie Speed, who was discovered running on the moors. Subsequently, adopted by a police officer 'Seargent Joe' who helped Jamie fulfil his potential, going on to win Olympic gold medals in running and swimming events. Post the Olympic success, the story subsequently took a darker turn with Jamie 'turning professional' and becoming involved in more dangerous but also more lucrative daredevil style events, which caused a rift between himself and his police officer mentor. The series began to lose focus at this point and petered out soon after.
 A Horse Called Ugly
 Hot Shot Hamish (writer Fred Baker, artist Julio Schiaffino) – moved to Roy of the Rovers. A comedy about a Scottish footballer with a powerful kick.
 Jet-Ace Logan (created by Mike Butterworth and Geoff Campion)
 Johnny Cougar (writer Barrie Tomlinson, artist Sandy James) – a Native American wrestler who grappled with a number of colourful opponents.
 King of the Track (writer Paul Gettens, artist Yvonne Hutton)
 MacTavish and O'Toole
 Martin's Marvellous Mini (writer Fred Baker, artist David Sque)
 Memorable Moments in Sport (Brian Lewis)
 Mighty Mouse (writer Fred Baker, artist Julio Schiaffino)
 Nipper (writer Tom Tully, artist Roylance) — from Scorcher, moved to Roy of the Rovers.
 Olac the Gladiator
 Paddy Ryan (Brian Lewis)
 Paceman - A relatively short lived story initially, predominantly about an slightly awkward, gangly and bespectacled school boy with little interest in sport. As he is reading a book, with a school cricket match being played in the background, a ball is hit in his direction. Annoyed, he proceeds to throw the ball back with sufficient energy that the sports teacher invites him to try out for the school cricket team. It is at this point he comes into conflict with the established team captain 'Rupert'  the archetypal, handsome popular sportsman. The series follows their tribulations in a fairly formulaic fashion, whereby they end up friends. The series ends relatively abruptly with the acknowledgement of how they will most likely end up playing cricket together for England. It is at this point that paceman was dropped to be replaced by Master Spy the following week.
 Phillip Driver
 Rod and Line (writer Paul Gettens)
 Roy of the Rovers (first appeared in 1954, created by Frank S. Pepper and Joe Colquhoun) – spun off into its own comic in 1976 (but continued to have stories in Tiger for a couple of years after this).
 Skid Solo (writer Fred Baker, artist John Vernon) – about a British Formula One driver in the 80s.
 Sintek
 The Slogger from Down Under
 The Strong Guy
 Star Rider – moved to Eagle.
 The Jailbird Commandos (writr/artist Ramón Gonzalez Antonaya)
 The Suicide Six (writer/artist Brian Lewis)
 Tallon of the Track – tomboy Jo Tallon runs the Flying Ospreys speedway team.
 Topps On Two Wheels (title later changed to Topps) - from Speed, about a motorcycle stunt rider based loosely on Eddie Kidd.
 The Tough Game – a rugby league story involving the exploits of three friends, Duggie Batson, Big Ernie Barnes, and Ape Man. Initially Big Ernie and Duggie played for Ruston Town, where they were subsequently joined by Ape Man. After a fallout with Rushton town, the three left to instead play for Potterdale.
 Typhoon Tracy, Trouble-shooter

Notes and references

Sources

External links
 Roy of the Rovers official website

Fleetway and IPC Comics titles
Comics magazines published in the United Kingdom
1954 comics debuts
1985 comics endings
Magazines established in 1954
Magazines disestablished in 1985